The following Confederate Army units and commanders fought in the Battle of Mill Springs of the American Civil War on January 19, 1862 near present-day Nancy, Kentucky. The Union order of battle is listed separately.

Abbreviations used

Military rank
 MG = Major General
 BG = Brigadier General
 Col = Colonel
 Ltc = Lieutenant Colonel
 Cpt = Captain

Other
 k = killed
 w = wounded

District of East Tennessee

MG George Bibb Crittenden

Nearby District Troops Not Engaged

 37th Tennessee: Col Moses White (engaged in the defense of Beech Grove)
 1st Tennessee Cavalry Battalion: Ltc Frank Nathaniel McNairy (may have been present at Beech Grove)
 3rd Tennessee Cavalry Battalion (2 companies): Ltc William Brazleton
 Tennessee Battery (Harding Artillery): Capt G. H. Monserratt, Cpt Ed Baxter

References
 Battle, J. H., et al. Kentucky: A History of the State (Louisville, KY: F. A. Battey, 1885).
 Lindsley, John B. The Military Annals of Tennessee, Confederate: First Series (Nashville, TN: J. M. Lindsley & Co.), 1886.
 The Official Records of the War of the Rebellion, Ser. I, Vol. 7, pp. 79–116; 824.
 Report of the Adjutant General of the State of Kentucky: Confederate Kentucky Volunteers, War 1861–65 Vol. I (Frankfort, KY: State Journal Company, Printers), 1915.

External links
 Mills Springs Battlefield Association
  Battle of Mill Springs/Fishing Creek by Geoffrey R. Walden

American Civil War orders of battle
Battle of Mill Springs